Georg August (11 January 1824 – 20 June 1876) was a member of the House of Mecklenburg-Strelitz.

Life
He was born in Neustrelitz as second son of George, Grand Duke of Mecklenburg-Strelitz (1779-1860) and his wife Marie (1796-1880), daughter of Prince Frederick of Hesse-Kassel and Princess Caroline of Nassau-Usingen. His paternal grandparents were Charles II, Grand Duke of Mecklenburg-Strelitz and Princess Friederike of Hesse-Darmstadt.

His sister Caroline Mariane married Frederick VII of Denmark. On 1860 his elder brother Frederick William succeeded their father as Grand Duke of Mecklenburg-Strelitz.

George August died on 20 June 1876 in St. Petersburg, at the age of 52. The line of his son George soon died out; since his first son had married morganatically, his second son Charles Michael became titular grand duke of Mecklenburg-Strelitz.

Marriage and children
On 16 February 1851 in St. Petersburg, George August married Grand Duchess Catherine Mikhailovna of Russia (1827-1894), daughter of Grand Duke Michael Pavlovich of Russia and had issue:
 Nikolaus (born and died 11 July 1854).
 Duchess Helene of Mecklenburg-Strelitz (16 January 1857 – 28 August 1936), married Prince Albert of Saxe-Altenburg.
 Duke Georg Alexander of Mecklenburg-Strelitz (6 June 1859 – 5 December 1909), he was Major General, Commander of the Life Guard Dragoon Regiment in the Russian arm and a music lover, a skillful cellist and composer.
 Maria-Frederica (3 June 1861 - 16 December 1861).
 Charles Michael, Duke of Mecklenburg (17 June 1863 – 6 December 1934), titular grand duke of Mecklenburg-Strelitz.

Honours and arms

Orders and decorations
  Mecklenburg: Grand Cross of the House Order of the Wendish Crown, with Crown in Ore, 15 November 1864
 : Grand Cross of the Royal Guelphic Order, 1842
  Electorate of Hesse: Grand Cross of the House Order of the Golden Lion, 18 December 1844
 :
 Knight of the Imperial Order of Saint Andrew the Apostle the First-called, July 1850; in Diamonds, February 1851
 Knight of the Imperial Order of Saint Alexander Nevsky, July 1850
 Knight of the Imperial Order of the White Eagle, July 1850
 Knight of the Imperial Order of Saint Anna, 1st Class, July 1850
 Knight of the Imperial Order of Saint Prince Vladimir, 2nd Class, August 1856; 1st Class, March 1866
  Kingdom of Prussia:
 Knight of the Order of the Black Eagle, 15 August 1851
 Knight of the Order of the Red Eagle, 1st Class
 : Grand Cross of the Royal Hungarian Order of Saint Stephen, 1860
 : Grand Cross of the House and Merit Order of Duke Peter Friedrich Ludwig, with Golden Crown, 8 August 1860
 : Knight of the Order of the Gold Lion of the House of Nassau, May 1863
 : Grand Cross of the Grand Ducal Hessian Order of Ludwig, 11 September 1864
 : Grand Cross of the Order of the White Falcon, 1 June 1868
 : Knight of the Order of the Elephant, 1 September 1868
 : Grand Cross of the Order of the Württemberg Crown, 1872

Ancestry

References

Sources
 Erstling, Frank; Frank Saß; Eberhard Schulze; Harald Witzke (April 2001). "Das Fürstenhaus von Mecklenburg-Strelitz". Mecklenburg-Strelitz, Beiträge zur Geschichte einer Region (in German). Friedland: Steffen. .
 Huberty, Michel; Alain Giraud; F. et B. Magdelaine. L'Allemagne Dynastique, Tome VI : Bade-Mecklembourg. .

Literature
 Mecklenburg-Strelitz – Beiträge zur Geschichte einer Region. Friedland i. Meckl.: Steffen, 22001

Bibliography
 Beéche, Arturo. The Grand Duchesses. Eurohistory, 2004. 
 Katin-Yartsev, M and Shumkov, A. Costume Ball at the Winter Palace. Russky Antiquariat, 2003, 
 Korneva, Galina & Cheboksarova, Tatiana. Russia & Europe: Dynastic Ties . Eurohistory, 2013.

External links
 
 Duchess Helene | House of Mecklenburg-Strelitz 
Duke Carl Michael | House of Mecklenburg-Strelitz

1824 births
1876 deaths
House of Mecklenburg-Strelitz
Grand Crosses of the Order of Saint Stephen of Hungary
Recipients of the Order of the White Eagle (Russia)
Recipients of the Order of St. Anna, 1st class
Recipients of the Order of St. Vladimir, 1st class
Recipients of the Order of St. Vladimir, 2nd class
Sons of monarchs